Širok Sokak (meaning "Wide Alley", from the Turkish word for "Street") is a long pedestrian street in Bitola, North Macedonia. The street is considered to be the centre of Bitola. It roughly starts at Magnolia Square and ends in the City Park. It is graced with neo-classical buildings that contain stores, cafés and restaurants. Širok Sokak is also home to several consulates, the Officers' Hall, and the Co-Cathedral of the Sacred Heart.

Gallery

Shopping districts and streets
Bitola
Pedestrian malls
Tourist attractions in Bitola